Marcos Vinícius Gomes de Lima (born 22 February 1992), commonly known as Dimba, is a Brazilian footballer who plays for Jaraguá as a forward.

Club career
Born in Rialma, Goiás, Dimba joined Santos' youth setup in 2009, aged 17, after starting out at Goiás. He made his first-team and Série A debut for Santos on 1 August 2010, coming on as a substitute for Madson in the 79th minute of 2–1 away win against Grêmio Barueri.

On 12 February 2012 Dimba scored his first goal for Peixe, the last of a 4–1 home win against Linense in the Campeonato Paulista championship. He finished the tournament with three goals, as his side were crowned champions.

On 3 September 2012 Dimba was loaned to fellow top-level club Náutico until December. He appeared rarely for the club, scoring once in five matches.

On 8 December 2012, Dimba was loaned to Botafogo-SP, alongside two other players. He appeared sparingly with the club, but managed to score twice in the 2013 Campeonato Paulista.

On 30 July 2013 Dimba joined Boa Esporte, also on loan. After failing to appear with his new side, he joined Penapolense in December, again on loan.

On 10 April 2014 Dimba moved to Vila Nova, yet again in a temporary deal. He was released by Santos in December 2014, after his contract expired.

In January 2015 Dimba returned to Penapolense, now in a permanent deal.

Career statistics

Honours
Santos
Campeonato Paulista: 2011, 2012

References

External links
Futebol de Goyaz profile 

1992 births
Living people
Sportspeople from Goiás
Brazilian footballers
Association football forwards
Campeonato Brasileiro Série A players
Campeonato Brasileiro Série B players
Campeonato Brasileiro Série D players
Santos FC players
Clube Náutico Capibaribe players
Botafogo Futebol Clube (SP) players
Boa Esporte Clube players
Clube Atlético Penapolense players
Vila Nova Futebol Clube players
Clube Recreativo e Atlético Catalano players
Grêmio Osasco Audax Esporte Clube players
Clube Atlético Linense players
Brazilian expatriate footballers
Brazilian expatriate sportspeople in Bahrain
Expatriate footballers in Bahrain